Apollophanes was a 1st-century BCE king in the area of eastern and central Punjab in modern India and Pakistan.

Apollophanes may also refer to:

History
Apollophanes of Antioch, stoic philosopher
Apollophanes of Athens, poet
Apollophanes of Cyzicus, friend of Persian satrap Pharnabazus II
Apollophanes of Seleucia, physician to Antiochus the Great in the late 3rd/early 2nd century BCE
Apollophanes, general of Alexander the Great, who became a satrap and killed during a battle against the Oritians

Other
 Apollophanes, a genus of spider; see Philodromidae